Nikias Arndt (born 18 November 1991) is a German professional track and road cyclist, who rides for UCI WorldTeam .

Career
He achieved his first professional victory at the 2013 Arctic Race of Norway, winning the third stage, en route to finishing third overall behind Thor Hushovd and Kenny van Hummel. Arndt also won the young riders classification at the event, as the best-placed rider under the age of 25. In June 2017, he was named in the startlist for the Tour de France.

Major results

Road
Source: 

2009
 2nd Time trial, National Junior Road Championships
 2nd Overall Course de la Paix Juniors
1st Stages 3 (ITT) & 4
 2nd Overall Driedaagse van Axel
1st Stage 1
 3rd Overall Niedersachsen Rundfahrt
1st Stage 4
 3rd Overall Trofeo Karlsberg
 4th Time trial, UCI Junior World Championships
 9th Overall Kroz Istru
2010
 1st  Overall Tour of Alanya
1st Stage 3
 1st Stage 4 Cinturón a Mallorca
 4th Overall Thüringen Rundfahrt der U23
1st Stage 6
 9th Overall Dookoła Mazowsza
2011
 1st Stage 5 Tour de l'Avenir
 8th Overall Thüringen Rundfahrt der U23
1st Stage 3
 9th Overall Tour of Greece
2012
 1st  Overall Tour de Berlin
1st Stages 2 (ITT) & 3
 Thüringen Rundfahrt der U23
1st  Points classification
1st Stage 7
 1st Stage 3 Istrian Spring Trophy
 1st  Points classification, Tour of Bulgaria
2013
 3rd Overall Arctic Race of Norway
1st  Young rider classification
1st Stage 3
2014
 1st Stage 3 Critérium du Dauphiné
 2nd Time trial, National Road Championships
2015
 1st Stage 6 Tour of Alberta
 National Road Championships
2nd Road race
2nd Time trial
 3rd Münsterland Giro
2016
 1st Stage 21 Giro d'Italia
 3rd Rund um Köln
 7th Scheldeprijs
 7th Rudi Altig Race
 8th Overall Tour de Yorkshire
2017
 1st Cadel Evans Great Ocean Road Race
2018
 3rd Time trial, National Road Championships
 6th Cadel Evans Great Ocean Road Race
 8th EuroEyes Cyclassics
2019
 1st Stage 8 Vuelta a España
2021
 1st  Team relay, UCI Road World Championships
 1st Stage 5 Tour de Pologne
2022
 2nd Road race, National Road Championships
 3rd Rund um Köln

Grand Tour general classification results timeline

Track

2009
 UCI Juniors World Championships
3rd  Omnium
3rd  Team pursuit
2011
 2011–12 UCI Track Cycling World Cup, Astana
3rd  Individual pursuit
3rd  Scratch
2012
 1st Points race, Perth International Grand Prix
 3rd  Omnium, 2011–12 UCI Track Cycling World Cup, Beijing

References

External links

 

1991 births
Living people
German male cyclists
Cyclists from Lower Saxony
People from Harburg (district)
German Giro d'Italia stage winners
German Vuelta a España stage winners
Olympic cyclists of Germany
Cyclists at the 2020 Summer Olympics
UCI Road World Champions (elite men)
21st-century German people